Yael (also spelled Jael) is a Biblical female given name.
It is the name of Yael, the wife of Heber in the Book of Judges, who killed Sisera, the king of the Canaanites, by hammering a tent peg through his temple. The meaning of the name is "ibex, mountain goat", from a verbal phrase meaning "he goes up".

In France, Yael or Yaël has been recorded was a somewhat rare feminine given name given in the 1970s and 1980s; it has since re-surfaced as a masculine given name ranked between 494th and 249th in popularity in France during 2000 to 2021.

People with the given name
 Yael Abecassis (b. 1967), Israeli actress and model
 Yael Arad (b. 1967), Israeli Olympic-medalist judoka
 Yael Averbuch (b. 1986), American soccer player
 Yael Bartana (b. 1970), Israeli video artist
 Yael Cohen (b. 1986), founder and CEO of Fuck Cancer
 Yael Dayan (b. 1939), Israeli writer and politician
 Yael Eckstein, senior vice president of the [International Fellowship of Christians and Jews
 Yael S. Feldman (b. 1941), Israeli-born American scholar
 Yael German (b. 1947), Israeli politician
 Yael Globerman (b. 1954), Israeli poet, writer, and translator
 Yael Goldman (b. 1978), Israeli actress, TV host, and model
 Yael Grobglas (b. 1984), Israeli actress
 Yaël Hassan (b. 1952), French-Israeli writer 
 Yael Tauman Kalai, Israeli-American cryptographer
 Yael Kanarek (b. 1967), Israeli-American artist
 Yael Kraus (b. 1977), Israeli singer/songwriter
 Yael Lempert (b. 1973/4), American diplomat
 Yael Goldstein Love (b. 1978), American novelist, editor, and book critic
 Yael Markovich (b. 1984), Israeli-American model and Israeli beauty queen titleholder
 Yael Meyer (b. 1981), Chilean singer, songwriter, musician, and producer
 Yael Naim (b. 1978), French-Israeli singer/songwriter
 Yaël Braun-Pivet (b. 1970), French lawyer and politician
 Yael Rom née Finkelstein (1932–2006), one of the first female pilots of the Israeli Air Force
 Jael Ruesch (née Ashton), known as Jael (1937–2000), American fantasy artist/illustrator
 Yael Stone (b. 1985), Australian actress
 Jael Strauss (d. 2018), contestant on America's Next Top Model, season 8
 Yael Tal (b. 1983), Israeli actress
 Yael Tamir (b. 1954), Israeli academic and politician 
 Yael Yuzon (b. 1983), Filipino vocalist and guitarist
 Yael Bar Zohar (b. 1980), Israeli actress, model, and television host

Middle name
 Jenifer Bartoli (Jenifer Yaël Dadouche-Bartoli), French pop singer
 Daniela Yael Krukower, Israeli-Argentinean judoka world champion

Pseudonym
 Jaël, stage name of Rahel Krebs, Swiss singer/songwriter
 Ivanka Trump took the Hebrew name Yael after converting to Judaism

Fictional characters
 Yael, a woman in ancient Israel who escapes the massacre at Masada, in Alice Hoffman's novel The Dovekeepers (2011)
 Yael Aronov, in John Sanford's  novel Storm Front (2013)
 Yael "Yaeli" Ashkenazi, in the Netflix Original series When Heroes Fly
 Yael Baron, in the Netflix Original series Degrassi: Next Class
 Yael Hoffman, in the TV series Weeds
 Alice Jael Reasoner, also known as Jael, an assassin in Joanna Russ' novel The Female Man (1975)
 Yael from "Return to Me" by Lynn Austin

See also
 Merkaz Yael, a village in Northern Israel, named in 1960 for the biblical figure

References

Hebrew feminine given names